Chron (released 10 January 2014 in Oslo, Norway on the label Rune Grammofon – AD36267-01) is an album by Arve Henriksen.

Background 
Chron was originally a part of the six piece vinyl release Solidification (2012). In 2014 Chron was also released as a CD release together with the album Cosmic Creation on Rune Grammofon. On Chron, Henriksen is exploring sounds and musical landscapes where his distinctive, whispering trumpet song is accompanied by strongly processed field recordings as well as an array of electronic instruments, to invite the listener towards inner pictorial creation.

Track listing 

All compositions by Arve Henriksen

Personnel 
Arve Henriksen - trumpet, voice, electronics

Credits 
Design by Kim Hiorthøy
Mastered by Helge Sten
Recorded by Arve Henriksen
Produced by Arve Henriksen

Notes 
Recorded and mixed at Arve Henriksen's home and in various locations such as hotels, airports, planes, railway stations and backstage in Norway, Sweden, Germany and Italy 
Mixed and mastered at Audio Virus Lab

References

External links 
Arve Henriksen website
ARVE HENRIKSEN - chron on YouTube

2014 albums
Arve Henriksen albums
Rune Grammofon albums
2014 in Norwegian music